15th Indiana Battery Light Artillery was an artillery battery that served in the Union Army during the American Civil War.

Service
The battery was organized in Indianapolis, Indiana March 11, 1862 and mustered in July 5, 1862, for three years service under the command of Captain John C. H. Von Sehlen.

The battery was attached to D'Utassy's Brigade, White's Division, Army of Virginia, to September 1862. Miles' Command, Harpers Ferry, September 1862. Camp Douglas, Illinois, and Indianapolis, Indiana, to April 1863. District of Central Kentucky, Department of the Ohio, to June 1863. 2nd Brigade, 4th Division, XXIII Corps, Army of the Ohio, to July 1863. 2nd Brigade, 1st Division, XXIII Corps, to August 1863. 1st Brigade, 4th Division, XXIII Corps, to October 1863. 2nd Brigade, 4th Division, XXIII Corps, to November 1863. 2nd Brigade, 1st Cavalry Division, Department of the Ohio, to December 1863. Artillery, 2nd Division, IX Corps, Department of the Ohio, to April 1864. Artillery, 3rd Division, XXIII Corps, to December 1864. Artillery, 2nd Division, XXIII Army Corps, Army of the Ohio, to February 1865, and Department of North Carolina to June 1865.

The 15th Indiana Battery Light Artillery mustered out June 30, 1865, in Indianapolis.

Detailed service
Left Indiana for Harpers Ferry, Virginia, July 5. Duty at Martinsburg and Harpers Ferry, until September 1862. Defense of Harpers Ferry September 13–15. Bolivar Heights September 14. Surrendered September 15. Paroled September 16 and sent to Annapolis, Maryland, then to Camp Douglas, Chicago, Illinois. Duty at Camp Douglas and Indianapolis until March 1863. Ordered to Louisville, Kentucky. Pursuit of Morgan in Kentucky April 1863. Action at Paris, Kentucky, April 16. Pursuit of Morgan through Indiana and Ohio July 1–26. New Lisbon, Ohio, July 26. Paris, Kentucky, July 29. Burnside's Campaign in eastern Tennessee August 16-October 17. Winter's Gap August 31. Actions at Athens, Calhoun, and Charleston September 25. Philadelphia September 27 and October 24. Knoxville Campaign November 4-December 23. Loudon November 14. Lenoir November 14–15. Campbell's Station November 16. Siege of Knoxville November 17-December 5. Kingston November 24. Bean's Station December 10. Blain's Cross Roads December 16–19. Duty at Knoxville until January 19, 1864. March to Red Clay, Georgia. Atlanta Campaign May 1-September 8. Demonstration on Rocky Faced Ridge May 8–11. Battle of Resaca May 14–15. Cartersville May 20. Operations on line of Pumpkin Vine Creek and battles about Dallas, New Hope Church, and Allatoona Hills May 25-June 5. Operations about Marietta and against Kennesaw Mountain June 10-July 2. Lost Mountain June 15–17. Muddy Creek June 17. Noyes Creek June 19. Cheyney's Farm June 22. Olley's Farm June 26–27. Assault on Kennesaw June 27. Nickajack Creek July 2–5. Chattahoochie River July 5–17. Siege of Atlanta July 22-August 25. Utoy Creek August 5–7. Flank movement on Jonesboro August 25–30. Battle of Jonesboro August 31-September 1. Lovejoy's Station September 2–6. Pursuit of Hood into Alabama October 1–26. Nashville Campaign November–December. Columbia, Duck River, November 24–27. Columbia Ford November 28–29. Battle of Franklin November 30. Battle of Nashville December 15–16. Pursuit of Hood, to the Tennessee River, December 17–28. At Clifton, Tennessee, until January 16, 1865. Movement to Washington, D.C., then to Fort Fisher, North Carolina, January 16-February 9. Operations against Hoke February 11–14. Fort Anderson February 18–19. Town Creek February 19–20. Capture of Wilmington February 22. Campaign of the Carolinas March 1-April 26. Advance on Goldsboro March 6–21. Occupation of Goldsboro March 21. Advance on Raleigh April 10–14. Occupation of Raleigh April 14. Bennett's House April 26. Surrender of Johnston and his army. Duty at Greensboro, North Carolina, until June. Ordered to Indianapolis.

Casualties
The battery lost a total of 14 men during service; 1 enlisted men killed, 1 officer and 12 enlisted men died of disease.

Commanders
 Captain John C. H. Von Sehlen - commissioned March 7, 1862
 Captain Alonzo D. Harvey - commissioned, May 10, 1864

See also

 List of Indiana Civil War regiments
 Indiana in the Civil War

References
 Dyer, Frederick H. A Compendium of the War of the Rebellion (Des Moines, IA: Dyer Pub. Co.), 1908.
 Fout, Frederick W. The Dark Days of the Civil War, 1861 to 1865: The West Virginia Campaign of 1861, the Antietam and Harper's Ferry Campaign of 1862, the East Tennessee campaign of 1863, the Atlanta campaign of 1864 (St. Louis, MO: F. A. Wagenfuehr), 1904.
 Fout, Frederick W. Die schwersten Tage des Bürgerkrieges von 1864 und 1865: Der Feldzug unter Schofield und Thomas gegen Hood in Tennessee, die Schlachten von Franklin und Nashville (St. Louis, MO: A. E. Fout), 1902.
Attribution
 

Military units and formations established in 1862
Military units and formations disestablished in 1865
Units and formations of the Union Army from Indiana
1862 establishments in Indiana
Artillery units and formations of the American Civil War